Margaret of Cleves may refer to:
 Margaret of Cleves (died 1190), wife of Louis III, Landgrave of Thuringia
 Margaret of Cleves (died 1251), wife of Otto II, Count of Guelders
 Margaret of Cleves (daughter of Dietrich VII, Count of Cleves), wife of Henry of Lodi (d. 1337) (son of Guy, Count of Flanders)
 Margaret of Cleves, Countess of the Marck, wife of Adolf II van der Mark
 Margaret of Cleves, Duchess of Bavaria-Straubing (1411), wife of Albrecht of Bavaria
 Margaret of Cleves, Duchess of Bavaria-Munich (141644), wife of William III of Bavaria and Ulrich V of Württemberg

People from the Duchy of Cleves